Enetea is a monotypic genus of Bolivian cellar spiders containing the single species, Enetea apatellata. It was first described by B. A. Huber in 2000, and is only found in Bolivia.

See also
 List of Pholcidae species

References

Monotypic Araneomorphae genera
Pholcidae
Spiders of South America